Archytas (428–347 BC) was an Ancient Greek philosopher, mathematician, astronomer, statesman, and strategist

Archytas can also refer to:
Archytas of Amphissa, a Greek poet who lived around the 3rd or 4th century BCE
Archytas of Mytilene, an ancient Greek musician whose date is uncertain
Archytas (crater), a lunar impact crater
Archytas (fly), a genus of flies in the family Tachinidae
14995 Archytas, a main-belt asteroid